Cécile Dumoulin (born 10 November 1966 in Hennebont, Morbihan) is a former member of the National Assembly of France and is a member of the Union for a Popular Movement. She is currently a departmental councilor for the Canton of Limay. She is a trained veterinarian.

References

1966 births
Living people
People from Hennebont
Politicians from Brittany
Union for a Popular Movement politicians
The Republicans (France) politicians
Deputies of the 13th National Assembly of the French Fifth Republic
Women members of the National Assembly (France)
21st-century French women politicians